Helene Costello (June 21, 1906 – January 26, 1957) was an American stage and film actress, most notably of the silent era.

Early life and career

Born in New York City, Costello was the youngest daughter of the prominent stage and pioneering film actor Maurice Costello and his actress wife Mae Costello (née Altschuk).  She had an older sister Dolores who also became an actress and would go on to marry John Barrymore.  Costello first appeared on screen, opposite her father, in the 1909 film adaptation of Victor Hugo's Les Misérables.  She would continue acting in films throughout the 1910s as a child actor and also worked in vaudeville and appeared in stage roles. In 1924, she appeared with her sister Dolores in George White's Scandals. Shortly thereafter, both sisters signed contracts with Warner Bros.  Costello reached her peak of public popularity in the mid-1920s and earned a reported $3,000 a week.

Although she had been appearing on screen since her early childhood, Costello was selected as a WAMPAS Baby Star in 1927, a promotional campaign sponsored by the Western Association of Motion Picture Advertisers in the United States, which honored thirteen young women each year whom they believed to be on the threshold of movie stardom. In 1928, Costello co-starred in the first all-talking full-length feature film Lights of New York. Later that same year, she was released from her contract with Warner Bros. after she refused to star as a leading lady opposite Rin Tin Tin once again; she had previously appeared alongside the canine star in the 1926 film While London Sleeps. Costello's final substantial role was opposite her sister Dolores in the all-star Technicolor musical revue The Show of Shows (1929). Costello and her sister performed in the "Meet My Sister" musical number.

After the advent of sound, Costello's career declined reportedly because her voice did not record well. She was also beset with personal problems including illnesses, an addiction to drugs and alcohol, three divorces, a public custody battle with her third ex-husband and financial difficulties. From 1930 to 1934, Costello did not appear in a film. In September 1935, she signed a contract with Metro-Goldwyn-Mayer and returned to the screen in a supporting role in Riffraff (1936).  Her final role was a bit part in the 1942 film The Black Swan. Later in 1942, Costello filed for bankruptcy.

Personal life
Costello was married four times, each marriage ending in divorce. Her first marriage was to football player John W. Regan in 1927. They divorced in June 1928.  Costello's second marriage was to actor/director Lowell Sherman, whom she married on March 15, 1930, in Beverly Hills. They separated in November 1931 and were divorced in May 1932. Costello third marriage was to Dr. Arturo de Barrio, a lawyer who came from a prominent Cuban family. They were married in Havana on January 6, 1933. Their marriage was considered invalid because Costello's divorce from her second husband was not finalized. They married for a second time in June 1933 in Los Angeles. They were divorced in 1939.

Her fourth and final marriage was to artist George Lee Le Blanc, whom Costello married in 1940. The couple had a daughter, Diedre, on February 18, 1941. Costello filed for divorce on August 6, 1947. Shortly after Costello filed for divorce, Le Blanc joined the Merchant Marine. Before leaving, Le Blanc left Diedre in the care of Costello's sister Dolores claiming that Costello was unfit to care for Diedre because of her alcoholism. Costello denied Le Blanc's claim and attempted to regain sole custody in September 1947. During one custody hearing, Costello's father and Lionel Barrymore (Dolores Costello's ex brother-in-law) testified that Costello did not have a drinking problem.  In April 1948, Costello was forced to drop her suit due to financial troubles and Le Blanc was awarded temporary custody of Diedre. Costello and Le Blanc were divorced in June 1948.

Death
On January 24, 1957, Costello was admitted to Patton State Hospital under the assumed name of Adrienne Costello for treatment for a drug and alcohol addiction. She died there two days later of pneumonia. Her sister, Dolores Costello Barrymore, was with her when she died. Her funeral was held on January 30, after which she was interred in an unmarked grave at Calvary Cemetery in East Los Angeles.

Other

For her contribution to the motion film industry, Helene Costello has a star on the Hollywood Walk of Fame at 1500 Vine Street in Hollywood.

Comedian Lou Costello, born Louis Cristillo, changed his name in honor of Helene Costello.  Coincidentally, both of them were born in 1906.

Selected filmography

References

External links

 
 

1906 births
1957 deaths
20th-century American actresses
Actresses from New York City
American child actresses
American film actresses
American silent film actresses
American stage actresses
Burials at Calvary Cemetery (Los Angeles)
Deaths from pneumonia in California
Metro-Goldwyn-Mayer contract players
Vaudeville performers
Warner Bros. contract players
WAMPAS Baby Stars
Drug-related deaths in California
Alcohol-related deaths in California